Fred Ainsworth (29 June 1894 – 1981) was an English footballer who played in The Football League for Derby County. He also played for Loughborough. He was born in Loughborough and died in 1981.

References

1894 births
1981 deaths
Sportspeople from Loughborough
Footballers from Leicestershire
English footballers
Association football forwards
Loughborough F.C. players
Derby County F.C. players
English Football League players